First Republic Square former Rose Revolution Square is a square in the Vera district of Tbilisi at the western end of Rustaveli Ave.

History 
The square was constructed in 1983 and named Republic Square. In 2005 it was renamed into Rose Revolution Square after the Rose Revolution. In 2018, the square was renamed into the First Republic Square in memory of the 100 anniversary of the establishment of the First Republic of Georgia.

References

External links
Tbilisi’s Rose Revolution Square: a Political Showcase

Rose Revolution
Democratic Republic of Georgia
Squares in Tbilisi